RC Willey Home Furnishings (RC Willey) is an American home furnishings company with stores in Utah, Idaho, Nevada and California. It was founded in 1932 by Rufus Call Willey in Syracuse, Utah, RC, as he was known to friends, began selling Hotpoint-brand appliances door-to-door out of the back of his red pickup truck. RC Willey currently has 10 locations across the Western United States and specializes in furniture, electronics, home appliances, mattresses, and flooring. In 1995, the holding company Berkshire Hathaway bought RC Willey in a deal with Warren Buffett.

History
RC Willey was founded in 1932 in Syracuse, Utah, then a farming community.

In 1932 Rufus Call Willey began selling Hotpoint Brand appliances door-to-door in Syracuse, Utah. Employed by the local electric company, he first started selling appliances from the back of his red pick-up truck on the side as he made his rounds. To guarantee customer satisfaction, Willey would lend out appliances for a week so that people could try them out. He also let them finance the purchases in installments over a three-year period, payable at harvest time. In 1950 he built his first store next door to his home in Syracuse.

In 1954, Willey left the company due to terminal cancer.  William H. Child, who had married Willey's daughter Darlene three years earlier, took over the business.  William Child is credited with adding furniture to the company's appliance offerings and risking personal funds to finance additions and new stores. His policies of honesty, hard work and frugality brought success to the company.  Many family members and friends worked hard in the business: Sheldon (Bill’s brother), Fay Hansen, Fay child (Bills father), and even Helen W. Barber (R. C. Willey’s widow) came in daily to count money. Multiple stores were built along the Wasatch Front, and RC Willey became one of the best known Home Furnishings retailer in the state of Utah.

Berkshire Hathaway, Inc., the holding company led by billionaire investor Warren Buffett, acquired RC Willey on May 24, 1995.

In 1998, RC Willey's South Salt Lake location became the site of a "Whaling Wall" mural by the famous marine artist Wyland.

Chief financial officer Scott L. Hymas, who had been with the company since 1987, succeeded Bill Child as CEO in February 2001.  Child remained chairman.  At the same time, Bill Child's nephew, Jeffrey S. Child, became the company's president.

Today, RC Willey is still family operated, and has 5 stores located in Utah, with additional stores in Idaho, Nevada and California.  The company is known for its furniture, electronics, appliances, mattresses, and flooring. It also has in-store credit and own brand credit cards. It is closed on Sundays and most major National Holidays.

RC Willey Credit cards are accepted at some other retailers, Including the Larry H Miller Automotive Group, The Mark Miller Automotive Group, and Big O Tires.

Timeline

Operations
RC Willey owns its own local distribution warehouses in Utah, Nevada, and California.

References

External links
RC Willey Home Furnishings
Book Review: The R.C. Willey Story by Ravi Nagarajan

Berkshire Hathaway
Companies based in Salt Lake City
Retail companies established in 1932
Furniture retailers of the United States
1932 establishments in Utah
1995 mergers and acquisitions